Parian is an urban barangay in Calamba, Laguna, located at the point of Manila South Rd.-Calamba National Highway.

Education 
 Pre-elementary to Secondary 
 Parian Elementary School

 College
 AMA Computer College - Calamba Campus
 Calamba Doctors' College 
 Rizal College Laguna
 STI Parian - Calamba
 Calamba Doctors' College

Establishments 
 Calamba Doctors' College 
 Commercial Building - Parian
 Commercial Building - Parian-Paciano Bridge
 Gawad Kalinga Building 
 Lianas Supermarket Parian
 MegaHealth - Parian
 Munda Motorworks Center
 Motorcycle Honda Motors - Parian
 River View Resort - Parian
 Rizal College - Calamba
 Save More Store - Parian
 Social Security System (SSS) - Calamba Branch
 Yamaha Calamba - Parian Branch

Population

Hospital

Calamba Doctors' Hospital, is a private hospital located at the northern portion of the city, situated at the Check Point-Bridge and National Highway intersection. It has a private school beside the hospital called "Calamba Doctors' College".

References

External links
 Official Website of the Provincial Government of Laguna

Barangays of Calamba, Laguna